Pål Stenmark (born 14 April 1976) is a Swedish biochemist and structural biologist. He was appointed professor of Structural Biochemistry at Lund University in 2019 and was appointed professor in Neurochemistry at  Stockholm University in 2021.

Stenmark's research focus on two areas related to human health:
 The Botulinum and Tetanus Neurotoxins
 Novel cancer targets in nucleotide metabolism
Stenmark is among other things known for his discovery of several novel neurotoxins, including a neurotoxin that specifically kills Malaria mosquitos.

Awards and honours
 The Lindbomska prize 2021 awarded by the Royal Swedish Academy of Sciences.
 The Sven and Ebba-Christina Hagberg prize, 2017.
 Ingvar Carlsson Award from the Swedish Foundation for Strategic Research, 2009.
 Selected for the Wenner-Gren Fellow program, 2007

References 

1976 births
Living people
Swedish biochemists
Structural biologists
Academic staff of Lund University
Academic staff of Stockholm University
Crystallographers